Fairview Historic District, in Valdosta in Lowndes County, Georgia, is a  historic district which was listed on the National Register of Historic Places in 1984.  It included 21 contributing buildings.

It includes works designed by architect Lloyd Greer and by Valdosta architect and contractor Stephen F. Fulghum (1857-1928).

References

External links

Historic districts on the National Register of Historic Places in Georgia (U.S. state)
Victorian architecture in Georgia (U.S. state)
Buildings and structures completed in 1880
National Register of Historic Places in Lowndes County, Georgia